Cypoides is a genus of moths in the family Sphingidae. The genus was erected by Shōnen Matsumura in 1921.

Species
Cypoides chinensis (Rothschild & Jordan, 1903)
Cypoides parachinensis Brechlin, 2009

References

Smerinthini
Moth genera
Taxa named by Shōnen Matsumura